Paxton James Schulte (born July 16, 1972) is a Canadian former professional ice hockey player.

Schulte was drafted 124th overall in the 1992 NHL Entry Draft by the Quebec Nordiques and played one game for the team during the 1993–94 NHL season, spending much of his tenure in the American Hockey League with the Cornwall Aces.  He was part of a blockbuster trade to the Calgary Flames for Vesa Viitakoski in 1996 and again played mostly in the AHL with the Saint John Flames.  He did manage to play a second NHL game for Calgary in 1996–97.

He moved to the United Kingdom in 1998, signing for the Bracknell Bees, winning the British Ice Hockey Superleague title in 2000.  He then moved to the Belfast Giants for the 2000/2001 season and made a huge reputation with the team, winning the Superleague title in 2002 and the Playoff Championship in 2003 and gained a huge following with Giants fans for his toughness on the ice, but more so for his huge heart and presence off the ice.  He returned to America in 2005, playing in the Central Hockey League for the Amarillo Gorillas and the Tulsa Oilers.

He retired in 2006 and is currently spending time on his father's Beef and Buffalo farm in Onoway, Alberta, near Edmonton.  He has 2 sons and a daughter.

Schulte returned to Belfast to play in a testimonial game for his friend and former Giants teammate, Todd Kelman on March 13, 2007. His number 27 jersey was retired on March 9, 2007 before the Giants' game against Newcastle Vipers.

Career statistics

Regular season and playoffs

External links

1972 births
Amarillo Gorillas players
Belfast Giants players
Bracknell Bees players
Calgary Flames players
Canadian ice hockey left wingers
Canadian people of German descent
Cornwall Aces players
Ice hockey people from Alberta
Las Vegas Thunder players
Living people
North Dakota Fighting Hawks men's ice hockey players
People from Lac Ste. Anne County
Quebec Nordiques draft picks
Quebec Nordiques players
Saint John Flames players
Spokane Chiefs players
Tulsa Oilers (1992–present) players
Canadian expatriate ice hockey players in England
Canadian expatriate ice hockey players in Northern Ireland
Canadian expatriate ice hockey players in the United States